The Popular University of Cesar, is a public, departmental, coeducational university based primarily in the city of Valledupar, Cesar, Colombia.

See also

 List of universities in Colombia

References

External links
 Popular University of Cesar official site 

Universities and colleges in Colombia
Educational institutions established in 1973
Valledupar
Buildings and structures in Cesar Department